Donovan Richards, Jr. (born April 9, 1983) is an American politician serving as the Borough President of Queens. He is also a former New York City Council member, having represented the 31st district. He is a member of the Democratic Party.

His former district includes portions of Arverne, Bayswater, Broad Channel, Cambria Heights, Edgemere, Far Rockaway, Howard Beach, Jamaica, John F. Kennedy International Airport, Laurelton, Rockaway Beach, Rosedale, South Ozone Park and Springfield Gardens in Queens.

Richards was the Democratic nominee for Queens Borough President in the November 3, 2020 general election. He defeated the Republican nominee Joann Ariola and independent candidate Dao Yin. Richards was sworn in as Queens Borough President on December 2, 2020.

Life and career
Richards was born and raised in southeast Queens. When he was young, he served with a mission in Port-au-Prince, Haiti on behalf of St. Albans Congregational Church.

He attended Redemption Christian Academy in Troy, New York later graduating from Jamaica High School in Queens. 

 He subsequently attended Nyack College, then Vaughn College of Aeronautics and Technology in Queens.

New York City Council
In June 2011, Richards became the chief of staff for New York City Councilman James Sanders, Jr., and when Sanders was elected to the New York State Senate, Richards won a 2013 special election to succeed him. Richards was appointed chair of the Committee on Environmental Protection. Richards was appointed to be the chair of the Subcommittee on Zoning and Franchises.

Queens Borough President bid
In June 2020, Richards secured the Democratic nomination for Borough President of Queens. On November 3, 2020, Richards won the election for Borough President of Queens.

References

External links
Councilman Donovan Richards 

|-

1983 births
20th-century African-American people
21st-century African-American politicians
21st-century American politicians
African-American New York City Council members
African-American people in New York (state) politics
Living people
New York (state) Democrats
New York City Council members
People from Queens, New York
Place of birth missing (living people)